Lemon Grove Kids Meet the Monsters is a trilogy of short movies released during 1965.  The movies are homages to the Bowery Boys series of movies from the mid-1940s to late 1950s.

Each movie of the trilogy features the antics of the bumbling Lemon Grove Kids. They are titled The Lemon  Grove Kids, The Lemon Grove Kids Meet the Green Grasshopper and the Vampire Lady from Outer Space, and The Lemon Grove Kids Go Hollywood!.  Moviemaker Ray Dennis Steckler created the characters, wrote 'Hollywood', and  directed the first movie of the trilogy. He also features in each segment, billed as Cash Flagg. The three shorts were edited into a feature, The Lemon Grove Kids Meet The Monsters. For theatrical showings, the movie was interrupted by the mummy from the movie going into the audience.

Cast
The Lemon Grove Kids
 Cash Flagg as Gopher
 Mike Kannon as Slug
 Bart Carsell as Duke Mazaratti
 Coleman Francis as "Big Ed" Narzak
 Larry Pearson as Larry
 Mary Morgan as Ma
 Rox Anne as Roxy
 Herb Robins as Killer Krump
 Kirk Kirksey as Kirk
 Jim Plunkett as Stretch
 Ed McWatters as The Saboteur
 Bob Burns III as Kogar
 Carolyn Brandt as First Girl in Amateur Movie
 Ron Haydock as Rat Pfink/Guitar Player
 Larry M. Byrd as Carnival Vendor
 Tony Flynn as Pee Wee
 George J. Morgan as Officer Clancy
 Cindy Shea as Second Girl in Amateur Movie
 Keith A. Wester as Man Shaving
 Berri Lee as Berri/Blind Man
 Jim Harmon as Chubby Lemon Grove Kid
 Dick Williams as Lemon Grove Kid
 Alan Neal as Member of Killer Krump's Gang
 Don Bouvier as Member of Killer Krump's Gang
 Anthony Cardoza as One of Big Ed's Men
 Don Schneider as Romeo, First Checkpoint
 Mary Demos as Dancing Girl
 Edward G. Wagner as Old Man

The Lemon Grove Kids Meet the Green Grasshopper and the Vampire Lady From Outer Space
 Ray Dennis Steckler as Gopher
 Mike Kannon as Slug
 Keith A. Wester as Marvin-Marvin
 J. Jay Hartford as Skinny
 Kedric Wolfe as Jocko
 Joe Bardo as Brick
 Felicia Guy as Flower
 Beverly Carter as Dum-Dum
 E. M. Kevke as Grasshopper
 Carolyn Brandt as Vampire Lady
 Coleman Francis as Mr. Miller
 Herb Robins as Chooper #1
 Doug Weise as Chooper #2
 Estelle Cooperman as Witch #1
 Patricia Wells as Witch #2
 D. J. Scord as Witch #3
 Tony Flynn as Pee Wee
 Linda C. Steckler as Linda
 Jeff Scott as Jeff
 Lisa Yesko as Lisa
 Kevin Miles as Kevin
 Keith Miles as Brian
 Peter Christoph as Pete
 Derek Quinn as Derek
 Moni Christoph as Moni
 Laura H. Steckler as Tickles

The Lemon Grove Kids Go Hollywood!
 Ray Dennis Steckler as Gopher
 Don Snyder as Don
 Tony Flynn as Pee Wee
 Linda Steckler as Linda
 Laura H. Steckler as Tickles
 Carolyn Brandt as Cee Cee Beaumont
 Herb Robbins as Killer Krump
 Eric Morris as Nick the Gyp
 Keith A. Wester as Swami Marvin
 Boris Balocoff as Mr. Carstairs
 Beverly Carter as Secretary
 Jack DuFrain as Film Editor
 George J. Morgan as Reporter #1
 Mary Morgan as Reporter #2

References

1965 films
1968 films
American children's films
1960s comedy horror films
American comedy horror films
1968 comedy films
1965 comedy films
1960s English-language films
1960s American films